Beaucoup is a French word meaning "many". It may also refer to:
Beaucoup, Illinois
Beaucoup Township, Washington County, Illinois
Beau Coup, a rock band from Cleveland, Ohio